IFIS is an academic publishing company and not-for-profit organisation operating in the sciences of food and health.

Based in Reading, IFIS produces the online bibliographic database, FSTA, a resource which the company has offered since 1969. FSTA (Food Science and Technology Abstracts) includes over 1.5 million scientific non-predatory records from trusted sources, all related to disciplines surrounding food and beverages.

As a not-for-profit organisation and educational charity, IFIS:
 offers access to researchers in developing countries through the Research4Life programmes, HINARI, ARDI, OARE and AGORA. 
 provides training and develops educational resources for the food community; for example, a best practice guide for literature searching and online learning module for how to research effectively.

IFIS work with a global network of regulatory experts in their Meet the Partners tool, and they produce Escalex Limits News and Alerts, a curated news and alerts service for legal developments in food.

IFIS also produces, in association with Wiley Blackwell, the Dictionary of Food Science & Technology, now in its second edition.

History 

Originally known as the International Food Information Service, IFIS was established in 1968 by the collaboration of four organisations:

 Institute of Food Technologists (IFT), USA
 The Centre for Biosciences and Agriculture International (CABI), UK
 Deutsche Landwirtschafts-Gesellschaft e.V (DLG), Germany
 The Centrum voor Landbouw Publikaties en Landbouwdocumemtatie (PUDOC), the Netherlands

The company was originally based at Lane End House in Shinfield, and moved to The Granary on Bridge Farm in Arborfield. Having moved in June 2020, they are now based in Winnersh Triangle, Berkshire, UK.

FSTA – Food Science and Technology Abstracts 

FSTA is a bibliographic abstracting and indexing (A&I) database for scientific and technological information relating to food, beverages, and nutrition. It contains over 1.5 million indexed records, with full-text links where available, covering over 5,475 active and historical journals, books, trade publications, reviews, conference proceedings, reports, patents, and standards.

The database is updated weekly with all records indexed against IFIS' thesaurus, containing over 13,000 food science keywords, curated and structured into hierarchies. The resource is used by researchers, industry practitioners, and students, and it contains information sources in 29 languages, sourced from publishers in over 60 countries.

Coverage includes all major commodities in the food and beverage industry, related applied and pure sciences, pet foods, food psychology, food economics, food safety, and more.

FSTA can be accessed through EBSCOhost, Ovid, Proquest Dialog, STN and Web of Science.

Launched in February 2022, was the FSTA database - with new full-text capability. FSTA with Full Text is produced in collaboration with EBSCO and is available exclusively on the EBSCO platform. Allowing users to quickly discover authoritative, food-focused research. Topics include::

Biotechnology
Food safety
Omics technologies
Pet foods
Sport science
Sustainability

References 

Academic publishing
Database companies
Food science institutes
Food technology organizations
Publishing companies of England